NGC 5624 is a spiral galaxy in the Boötes constellation.

References

External links

Spiral galaxies
Boötes
5624
09256
51568